William F. Vallicella is an American philosopher.

Biography

Vallicella has a Ph.D. (Boston College; 1978), taught for a number of years at University of Dayton (where he was a tenured Associate Professor of Philosophy; 1978–91) and Case Western Reserve University (Visiting Associate Professor of Philosophy; 1989–91), and retired to Gold Canyon, Arizona from where he now contributes to philosophy mainly online.  He is the author of many published articles, primarily on the subjects of metaphysics and philosophy of religion.

In the short chapter on him in the book Falling in love with wisdom: American philosophers talk about their calling, Vallicella discusses the philosophical questions which he happened to think about in his youth, such as "What if God hadn't created anything?", "What if even God didn't exist", and "Why is good, good, and evil, evil?", and his thoughts on the inquiry of philosophy.

Publications

Books
Kant, subjectivity and facticity, Boston College, 1978
 A Paradigm Theory of Existence: Onto-Theology Vindicated, Kluwer Academic Publishers 2002, .  Forbes summarizes this book as follows:

What is it for any contingent thing to exist? Why does any contingent thing exist? For some time now, the preferred style in addressing such questions has been deflationary when it has not been eliminativist. In its critical half, this book thoroughly analyzes and demolishes the main deflationary and eliminativist accounts of existence, including those of Brentano, Frege, Russell, and Quine, thereby restoring existence to its rightful place as one of the deep topics in philosophy, if not the deepest. In its constructive half, the book defends the thesis that the two questions admit of a unified answer, and that this answer takes the form of what the author calls a paradigm theory of existence. The central idea of the paradigm theory is that existence itself is a paradigmatically existent concrete individual. In this way the author vindicates onto-theology and puts paid to the Heideggerian conceit that Being cannot itself be a being. This work will be of interest to all serious students and teachers of philosophy, especially those interested in metaphysics and the philosophy of religion.

Chapters

The Problem of Existence, by Arthur Witherall, Aldershot: Ashgate Publishing, 2002, Philo, 6 (1), 2003, 176–88.
 Philosophia Christi, Volume 6, Issue 1, Chapter:  "The Moreland Willard Lotze Thesis on Being," p. 27, Evangelical Philosophical Society, 2004.
The philosophy of Panayot Butchvarov: a collegial evaluation, Larry Lee Blackman, Chapter:  "Does Existence Itself Exist?; Transcendental Nihilism Meets the Paradigm Theory", p. 57, Volume 62 of Problems in contemporary philosophy, E. Mellen Press, 2005, .
Proceedings of the Heraclitean Society, Volume 19, Chapter:  "Is Existence a Property of Individuals?," p. 19, William F. Vallicella, Western Michigan University, Heraclitean Society.

Articles
He has published over 40 scholarly articles, including:

The article on divine simplicity in the Stanford Encyclopedia of Philosophy, 2006
"Classical Theism and Global Supervenience Physicalism"
"To the Tautological Interpretation: Review of Robert Sokolowski", WF Vallicella, Philosophy & Social Criticism, 1974
"Sokolowski on Husserl: From the Metaphysical to the Tautological Interpretation," WF Vallicella, Cultural Hermeneutics, 1976
"Kant, subjectivity and facticity", WF Vallicella, 1978, Boston College
"The Problem of Being in the Early Heidegger", WF Vallicella, The Thomist, 1981
"A Critique of the Quantificational Account of Existence", WF Vallicella, The Thomist, 1983
"Kant, Heidegger, and the Problem of the Thing in Itself", WF Vallicella, International Philosophical Quarterly, 1983
"Relativism, Truth, and the Symmetry Thesis", WF Vallicella, Monist, 1984
"Heidegger's Reduction of Being to Truth," WF Vallicella, The New Scholasticism, 1985
"A Note on Hintikka's Refutation of the Ontological Argument," WF Vallicella, Faith Phil 6, 1989
"Reply to Zimmerman: Heidegger and the problem of being", WF Vallicella, International Philosophical Quarterly, 1990
"Two Faces of Theism, WF Vallicella, Idealistic Studies, 1990
"Consciousness and Intentionality: Illusions?", W Vallicella, Idealistic Studies, 1991
"Divine Simplicity: A New Defense", W Vallicella, Faith and Philosophy, 1992
"Has the Ontological Argument Been Refuted?", WF Vallicella, Religious Studies, 1993
"Existence and Indefinite Identifiability", WF Vallicella, Southwest Philosophy Review, 1995
"No time for propositions", WF Vallicella, Philosophia, 1995; discussed by Le Poidevan here 
"Concurrentism or occasionalism?," Vallicella, The American Catholic Philosophical Quarterly, 1996
"John Polkinghorne, The Faith of a Physicist: Reflections of a Bottom-Up Thinker," WF Vallicella, International Studies in Philosophy, 1996, State University of New York
"Bundles and indiscernibility: a reply to O'Leary-Hawthorne", WF Vallicella, Analysis, 1997
"The Hume-Edwards Objection to the Cosmological Argument", WF Vallicella, Journal of Philosophical Research, 1997
"On an Insufficient Argument Against Sufficient Reason", WF Vallicella, Ratio, 1997
"Could a Classical Theist Be a Physicalist?," WF Vallicella, Faith and Philosophy, 1998, The University of Notre Dame
"Bradley's Regress Argument and Relation-Instances", WF Vallicella, The Modern Schoolman, 1999/2004
"God, causation and occasionalism", WF Vallicella, Religious Studies, 1999, Cambridge Univ Press
"Could the Universe Cause itself to Exist?", 75: 604–612, WF Vallicella, 2000, Cambridge University Press
"Does the Cosmological Argument Depend on the Ontological?", W Vallicella, Faith and Philosophy, 2000
"From facts to God: An onto-cosmological argument", WF Vallicella, International Journal for Philosophy of Religion, 2000
"Heidegger's Beiträge zur Philosophie," 139–56, William F. Vallicella, Religion, 2000
"Meinong's Complexes", The Monist, LXXXIII, pp. 89–100, William Vallicella, 2000.
"Three Conceptions of States of Affairs", WF Vallicella, Noûs, 34 (2), 237–59, 2000
"Brentano on Existence", WF Vallicella, History of Philosophy Quarterly, 2001, Bowling Green State University
"No self? A look at a Buddhist argument," WF Vallicella, International Philosophical Quarterly, 2002
"The creation–conservation dilemma and presentist four-dimensionalism", WF Vallicella, Religious Studies, 2002, Cambridge University Press
"Incarnation and Identity," WF Valicella, Philo, vol. 5, no. 1 (Spring-Summer 2002), pp. 84–93
"Relations, Monism, and the Vindication of Bradley's Regress", Dialectica 56 (1), 3–35, 2002
"A Paradigm Theory of Existence: Onto-Theology Vindicated," William F. Vallicella, L Armour – Philosophy in Review, 2003
"Kant Chastened But Vindicated:  Rejoinder to Forgie, WF Vallicella, Faith and Philosophy," 2004, The University of Notre Dame
"Does Existence Itself Exist? Transcendental Nihilism Meets the Paradigm Theory", WF Vallicella, Problems in Contemporary Philosophy, 2005
"Melville Y. Stewart. The Greater-Good Defence: An Essay on the Rationality of Faith," Pp. xi+, WF Vallicella, Religious Studies, 2008, Cambridge University Press

See also
American philosophy
List of American philosophers

References

External links
Vallicella's philosophical blog
"On Vallicella's Critique of Heidegger," Michael E. Zimmerman, International Philosophical Quarterly, XXXIX, December, 1989
The Unity of the Proposition, Richard Gaskin, Oxford University Press, 2009, ; discusses Vallicella's writings at 221, 316, 355, 370–74
"Does the ontological argument beg the question?", P.J. McGrath, Religious Studies, vol. 29, p. 97, 1994 (response to William F. Vallicella, Religious Studies, vol. 29, p. 97, 1993)
Ontological arguments and belief in God, p. 331, Graham Robert Oppy, Cambridge University Press, 1995  ; discusses Vallicella's treatment of Plantiga's ontological arguments
"Kant on the Dependency of the Cosmological Argument on the Ontological Argument," DP Smith, European Journal of Philosophy, 2003; argument is inspired by, and takes its lead from, Vallicella's 'Does the Cosmological Argument Depend on the Ontological?', 2000
"The reason the universe exists is that it caused itself to exist", Q Smith, Philosophy, 1999, Cambridge University Press; discusses premise that Deltete shares with Vallicella and others.
"Relata-Specific Relations: A Response to Vallicella", JW Wieland, A Betti, Dialectica, 2008
"Conservation, discontinuous time, and causal continuity," ET Yang, Religious Studies, 2009, Cambridge University Press; responds to dilemma and analysis posed by Vallicella for continuous-creation accounts of conservation

20th-century American male writers
20th-century American philosophers
20th-century Christians
20th-century essayists
20th-century American historians
21st-century American male writers
21st-century American philosophers
21st-century Christians
21st-century essayists
21st-century American historians
American Christians
American male essayists
American male non-fiction writers
American philosophy academics
Analytic philosophers
Aphorists
Boston College alumni
Case Western Reserve University faculty
Christian apologists
Christian philosophers
Continental philosophers
Epistemologists
Existentialists
Heidegger scholars
Historians of philosophy
Kant scholars
Living people
Metaphysicians
Metaphysics writers
Ontologists
Philosophers of culture
Philosophers of history
Philosophers of mind
Philosophers of religion
University of Dayton faculty
Writers about religion and science
Year of birth missing (living people)